Hugh Vaughan-Thomas (13 May 1910 — 20 October 1986) was a Welsh cricketer. He was a right-handed batsman who played for Glamorgan.

Vaughan-Thomas, who as well as excelling at cricket, was a talented hockey and tennis player, made his only first-class appearance in 1933, against Gloucestershire. He scored just two runs in the only innings in which he batted.

External links
Hugh Vaughan-Thomas at Cricket Archive 
Hugh Vaughan-Thomas at EspncricinfoNo

1910 births
1986 deaths
Welsh cricketers
Glamorgan cricketers